Rowland Berkeley (about 1548 – 1 June 1611) of Worcester and Spetchley was an English clothier and politician who sat in the House of Commons at various times between 1593 and 1611.

Berkeley was the eighth son of William Berkeley, mayor and MP for Hereford, great-nephew of William, 1st Marquess of Berkeley.

Worcester and Spetchley
Rowland Berkeley became a successful clothier at Worcester. He bought Spetchley Park from Philip Sheldon. He was bailiff of Worcester in 1585 and 1587. He was appointed first master of the Clothers Company of Worcester under the Clothers Charter of 23 September 1590. After his death his eldest son acquired extensive property in Cotheridge.

House of Commons
In 1593, he was elected Member of Parliament for Worcester. He was re-elected MP for Worcester in 1597 and 1601. In 1605 he was elected MP for Worcester again in a by-election and sat until his death in 1611.

Family
Berkeley married 15 April 1574 Catherine Hayward, daughter of Thomas Hayward.
Their children included:
 William Berkeley (1582–1658) of Cotheridge
 Robert Berkeley (1584–1656) of Spetchley
 Dorothy, eldest daughter, who married in 1593 Thomas Wylde (1558–1610, grandson of Thomas Wylde) of The Commandery and was mother of Margaret, who married Samuel Fell
 Joan, sixth daughter, who married firstly Henry Bright and secondly Edward Annesley

References

1611 deaths
Business people from Worcester, England
Place of birth missing
English MPs 1593
English MPs 1597–1598
English MPs 1601
English MPs 1604–1611
Year of birth uncertain
Members of the Parliament of England for Worcester